Voloske is a village in Voloske Commune in central Ukraine.  It is in Dnipro Raion in Dnipropetrovsk Oblast. It belongs to Novooleksandrivka rural hromada, one of the hromadas of Ukraine.

References

Yekaterinoslav Governorate
Populated places on the Dnieper in Ukraine
Villages in Dnipro Raion